This is a list of Indigenous Australian musicians.

Solo artists
Trevor Adamson – country/gospel singer
Danzal Baker (Baker Boy) – rapper, singer
Auriel Andrew – country musician
Christine Anu (Torres Strait Islander) – singer-songwriter, actress, producer, and speaker
David Arden – singer and guitar player
George Assang – singer and actor
Mark Atkins – didgeridoo player
Maroochy Barambah – mezzo-soprano
Black Allan Barker – country/blues singer
William Barton – didgeridoo player
Lou Bennett – musician and actor
Birdz – rapper, songwriter
Harold Blair – tenor
David Blanasi – didgeridoo player
Briggs – hip hop performer
Brothablack – hip hop performer
Burragubba – didgeridoo player
Sammy Butcher – guitarist, ex Warumpi Band
Kev Carmody – singer-songwriter
Bernard Carney – all-round Australian musician
Troy Cassar-Daley – country musician
Deborah Cheetham – opera singer
Jimmy Chi – composer, musician and playwright
Marcus Corowa – blues, soul and jazz musician
Marlene Cummins – blues singer and saxophonist
Miiesha - singer songwriter
Seaman Dan (Torres Strait Islander) – singer-songwriter
Ash Dargan – didgeridoo player
Alan Dargin – didgeridoo player
Scott Darlow – singer-songwriter, didgeridoo player
Reggae Dave – reggae musician
Casey Donovan – pop/rock singer, winner of the second season (2004) of Australian Idol
Emma Donovan – singer-songwriter
Kutcha Edwards – singer-songwriter
Dewayne Everettsmith – Tasmanian singer
Sharnee Fenwick – country singer
Isaiah Firebrace – soul/pop singer
Tom Foster (musician) – Gospel songwriter
Leah Flanagan – Darwin singer-songwriter
Richard Frankland – playwright, musician and activist
Tia Gostelow – singer-songwriter
Gawurra – singer-songwriter
Joe Geia – musician, composer of the song "Yil Lull"
Robyn Green – gospel singer
Djalu Gurruwiwi – didgeridoo player
Grant Hansen – musician and broadcaster
Becca Hatch – musician and singer-songwriter
Glen Heald – musician, songwriter, producer
David Hudson – didgeridoo player
Ruby Hunter – singer-songwriter
Adam James – country singer
Toni Janke – soul singer
Jimblah – hip hop artist
JK-47 – rapper, musician
J-Milla – rapper, singer-songwriter
Tasman Keith – rapper, singer-songwriter
Roger Knox – country singer
Sharon-Lee Lane – country singer
The Kid Laroi – rapper, singer-songwriter
Lady Lash – rapper, singer-songwriter
Herbie Laughton – country singer
Georgia Lee – jazz and blues singer
Tom E. Lewis – actor and musician
Little G – rapper
Jimmy Little – country singer
Mau Power – hip hop artist from the Torres Strait Islands
Jessica Mauboy – pop and R&B singer, runner-up in the third season (2006) of Australian Idol
Djolpa McKenzie – reggae, rock, dub and funk singer
Bobby McLeod – activist, poet, healer and musician
Sasha McLeod (Sycco) – singer-songwriter
Ali Mills – singer from Darwin
Rita Mills – singer from Torres Strait Islands
Shellie Morris – singer-songwriter
Munkimuk – hip hop artist
Johnny Nicol – jazz singer
Rachel Perkins – director, producer, screenwriter and singer
Thelma Plum – pop singer-songwriter
Ziggy Ramo – singer-songwriter
Bob Randall – singer and author
Wilma Reading – jazz singer
Archie Roach – singer-songwriter and guitarist
George Rrurrambu – rock singer, ex Warumpi Band
Xavier Rudd – Australian folk singer of Aboriginal heritage
Vic Simms – singer-songwriter
Glenn Skuthorpe – folk and country singer-songwriter
Alice Skye – singer-songwriter
Budjerah Slabb (Budjerah) – singer-songwriter
Radical Son – Indigenous Australian and Tongan singer
Dan Sultan – rock singer
Richard Walley – activist and didgeridoo player
Kaiit Bellamia Waup (Kaiit) – neo soul singer
Rochelle Watson – R&B and soul singer
Brenda Webb – rock singer
Naomi Wenitong – singer-songwriter from Shakaya and The Last Kinection
David Williams – didgeridoo player
Gus Williams – country musician, community leader
Warren H Williams – country musician
Bart Willoughby – musician, No Fixed Address, Coloured Stone, Mixed Relations
Emily Wurramara – roots singer-songwriter
Frank Yamma – indigenous roots musician
Isaac Yamma – country musician
Dougie Young – country musician
Ursula Yovich – actress and singer
Geoffrey Gurrumul Yunupingu – singer and guitarist, Yothu Yindi, Saltwater Band
Mandawuy Yunupingu – singer, community leader, Yothu Yindi

Indigenous bands

 A.B. Original – hip hop duo
 Aim 4 More – Brisbane band
 Amunda – rock band from Alice Springs
 Banawurun – "outback motown" band
 Beddy Rays – punk rock band from Redland Bay, Queensland, frontman 'Jacko' is a Woppaburra man 
 The Black Arm Band – concert band of some of Australia's premier Indigenous musicians
 Black Image – North Queensland band
 Blackfire – rock band from Melbourne
 Blackstorm – rock/blues band from Yuendumu
 Blekbala Mujik (Blackfella Music) – band from Arnhem Land
 Busby Marou – folk country pop band from Rockhampton
 Coloured Stone – rock/reggae group from Ceduna
 The Country Lads – country rock band
 Deadheart – rock/pop band from Geelong
 Dispossessed – Sydney heavy metal band
 Djaambi – band from Melbourne
 The Donovans – country band featuring the Donovan family
 East Journey – rock/reggae band
 Electric Fields – electronic music duo 
 Fitzroy Xpress – country rock group from Fitzroy Crossing
 Ilkari Maru – rock band from Central Australia
 Iwantja – rock band from Indulkana, South Australia
 King Stingray – punk rock band, descendents from members of Yothu Yindi
 Kuckles – Broome band featuring Jimmy Chi
 Kulumindini Band – rock band from Elliott, Northern Territory
 Lajamanu Teenage Band – rock band from Lajamanu, Northern Territory
 The Last Kinection – hip-hop group from Newcastle, New South Wales
 Letterstick Band – reggae/rock band from Northeast Arnhem Land
 Local Knowledge – hip-hop group from Newcastle, New South Wales
 Lonely Boys – rock band from Ngukurr, Northern Territory
 The Medics – rock band from Cairns, Queensland
 Microwave Jenny – singer-songwriters
 Mills Sisters – band from Torres Strait Islands
 Mixed Relations – reggae, pop, rock and jazz band
 Nabarlek – Indigenous roots band from Arnhem Land
 Native Ryme Syndicate – Brisbane rap group
 No Fixed Address – reggae/ska/rock band from Ceduna
 NoKTuRNL – hip hop/metal group from Alice Springs
 North Tanami Band – reggae/ska band from Lajamanu, Northern Territory
 Ntaria Ladies Choir – choir from Hermannsburg, Northern Territory
 The Pigram Brothers – country/folk group from Broome
 Saltwater Band – Indigenous roots band from Galiwin'ku on Elcho Island
 Scrap Metal – country/reggae band from Broome, Western Australia
 Shakaya – two piece girl group
 Soft Sands – country and gospel band from Galiwin'ku on Elcho Island
 South West Syndicate – hip hip group
 Spin.FX – reggae, rock, country band from Papunya, Northern Territory
 Spinifex Gum - adolescent choral ensemble
 Stiff Gins – acoustic group from Sydney
 Stik n Move – hip hop duo
 Street Warriors – hip-hop group from Newcastle, New South Wales
 Sunrize Band – rock band from Maningrida
 The Merindas – pop duo
 Thylacine – rock band from Darwin, Northern Territory
 Tiddas – three girl folk band from Victoria, Australia
 Tjimba and the Yung Warriors – hip hop group from Melbourne
 Tjintu Desert Band – desert reggae band 
 Tjupi Band – reggae band from Papunya, Northern Territory
 Us Mob – rock band from South Australia
 Warumpi Band – rock/reggae group from Papunya
 The Wilcannia Mob – rap/hip-hop group from Wilcannia, New South Wales
 Wild Water – reggae, rock, dub and funk band
 Wildflower – rock/reggae band
 Harry and Wilga Williams – country music artists
 Wirrinyga Band – rock band from Milingimbi, Northern Territory
 Yabu Band – desert rock/reggae band
 Yothu Yindi – rock/folk group from Arnhem Land
 Yugul – blues band

See also
Aboriginal Centre for the Performing Arts
Aboriginal rock
Buried Country
Indigenous Australian music
Indigenous Australians
List of Indigenous Australian performing artists
Vibe Australia

References

 
Indigenous
 
Musicians